The Merchant Marine Vietnam Service Medal (Ribbon) is a decoration of the United States Merchant Marine authorized on May 20, 1968.

Conditions 
The decoration is awarded to officers and men for service aboard merchant vessels flying the American flag in Vietnam waters between July 4, 1965 and August 15, 1973.

Design 
Prior to 1992, the Merchant Marine Vietnam Service Medal was a ribbon-only decoration.  Afterwards, a medal was affixed to the ribbon.  As follows is a design note: "the dragon is traditionally associated with Vietnam, the shoreline denotes service in the coastal waters adjacent to Vietnam, and the anchor symbolizes maritime service."

See also 
 Awards and decorations of the United States government
 Awards and Decorations of the United States Maritime Administration
 Awards and decorations of the United States Merchant Marine
 Awards and decorations of the United States military

References

External links
 
Laws Establishing Merchant Marine Medals

Awards and decorations of the United States Merchant Marine
Awards established in 1968
1968 establishments in the United States